The Church of Antioch (Arabic: كنيسة أنطاكية) was one of the five major churches that composed the Christian Church before the East–West Schism.

Church of Antioch branches
The Church of Antioch has developed into the following main branches:

Catholic
Syriac Maronite Church
Melkite Greek Catholic Church
Syriac Catholic Church

Orthodox Church of Antioch
Eastern Orthodox
Greek Orthodox Church of Antioch, or the Eastern Orthodox Patriarchate of Antioch and All the East

Oriental Orthodox
Syriac Orthodox Church

Other churches
Catholic Apostolic Church of Antioch, an independent Catholic church not in communion with Rome founded in 1958
Free Church of Antioch, one of several Malabar Rite Independent Catholic Churches claiming valid lines of apostolic succession in the historical episcopate but not in communion with Rome or any Orthodox patriarch

Church Buildings 

 Church of Saint Peter, in Antioch

See also
Antioch
Patriarch of Antioch
List of Patriarchs of Antioch
Antioch International Movement of Churches